The  is a railway line operated by the West Japan Railway Company (JR West) between Tottori, Tottori Prefecture and Tsuyama, Okayama Prefecture, Japan.

Route data 
Operating Company: 
West Japan Railway Company (Services and tracks)
Distance:
Tottori — Tsuyama: 70.8 km (44.0 mi)
Gauge: 
Stations: 19
Double-tracking: None
Electrification: Not electrified
Railway signalling:
Special automatic occlusive (track circuit detection type)

Stations
 ●: Stop ▲: Some services stop ｜: Pass

Rolling stock

Local
 KiHa 47
 KiHa 120
 KiHa 121 and KiHa 126 series
 Chizu Express HOT3500
 Wakasa Railway WT3000 and WT3300

Limited Express
 KiHa 187 series (Super Inaba)
 Chizu Express HOT7000 series (Super Hakuto)

History
The Imbi line was built by the Japanese Government Railway, with the first section opened from Tottori to Mochigase in 1919, extended to Chizu in 1923. The Tsuyama to Mimasaka-Kamo section, opened in 1928, was extended to Mimasaka-Kawai in 1931 and the line was completed with the opening of the section to Chizu (including a 3,077 m tunnel) in 1932.

CTC signalling was commissioned between Tottori and Chizu in 1994.

See also
 List of railway lines in Japan

References

1067 mm gauge railways in Japan
Lines of West Japan Railway Company
Rail transport in Okayama Prefecture
Rail transport in Tottori Prefecture